Daniel González Güiza (born 17 August 1980) is a Spanish professional footballer who plays as a striker for CD Rota.

A late bloomer, he made a name for himself at the age of 27, being crowned La Liga top scorer with Mallorca. Subsequently, he helped the Spain national team win Euro 2008, and signed with Fenerbahçe in Turkey shortly afterwards.

Over eight seasons, Güiza amassed Spanish top division totals of 141 matches and 52 goals, mainly with Mallorca and Getafe. Throughout his career, he played in three continents.

Club career

Early years
Having started playing on the streets of his hometown of Jerez de la Frontera in Cádiz, Güiza used to hide behind trees in an attempt to avoid the running, despite being then coached by boyhood idol Kiko, who begun his professional career with local Cádiz CF. He eventually made it into his local club Xerez CD and, after one season there, first showed his eye for goal at Segunda División B side Dos Hermanas CF, loaned immediately after RCD Mallorca bought him. Such performances saw him make his debut in La Liga for the latter at the age of 19, but he would fail to perform, being relegated to the reserves.

Güiza was then loaned out to Recreativo de Huelva, but could not find a secure place in the team, and moved soon after to FC Barcelona B, also on loan. Subsequently, he joined Ciudad de Murcia of the Segunda División, where his career saw a turning point with two consecutive top-five finishes in the top scorers' list (runner-up in the 2004–05 season).

Getafe
This impressed Bernd Schuster enough to sign Güiza for Getafe CF in the summer of 2005. He was an instant first-choice at his new team and became recognised as a top flight striker, scoring 27 goals in 70 competitive games – seven in nine Copa del Rey appearances – while the team from the Madrid outskirts achieved back-to-back ninth-league places.

The club's president, Ángel Torres, described him as "the best finisher in the first division after Ronaldo". On 10 May 2007, he was one of three players on target in a 4–0 home defeat of FC Barcelona for the semi-finals of the Copa del Rey, which meant qualification for the decisive match for the first time ever after a 6–5 aggregate win.

Mallorca
After four years, Güiza returned to Mallorca in a €5 million move, brokered by his wife and agent Nuria Bermúdez, experiencing a breakthrough season. On 20 April 2008 he scored a hat-trick against Real Murcia, and finished the campaign as the league's top scorer by scoring 27 goals in 37 matches, a feat achieved without a single penalty kick.

Club coach Gregorio Manzano said: "In 24 years of coaching I've never had the winner of the Pichichi in my team. Dani is the top goalscorer in our league, and deserves extra credit for doing it without taking penalties, and he is also worthy of selection to Euro 2008".

Fenerbahçe
On 8 July 2008, Güiza joined Turkish club Fenerbahçe SK for €14 million. He managed to score twice in the Süper Lig in his first month, adding another two in the team's run in the UEFA Champions League.

Güiza ended a long scoring drought on 22 March 2009 with an early goal against Bursaspor, as Fenerbahçe lost 2–1 in the dying minutes of the game. Prior to the beginning of 2009–10 he put three past Budapest Honvéd FC in the third qualifying round of the UEFA Europa League, in a 5–1 home win (6–2 on aggregate), netting his first in the domestic competition in matchday one against Denizlispor, in the first minute of the game.

In his first two seasons in Istanbul, Güiza helped the team to consecutive Turkish Cup finals, netting in the 2008–09 edition in a 4–2 loss to Beşiktaş JK.

Return to Getafe
On 18 August 2011, one day after his 31st birthday, Güiza moved to former club Getafe for €6 million, agreeing to a three-year contract shortly after. He was regularly played in the first season in his second spell, starting in 15 of his appearances, but failed to reproduce his previous form and scored just three goals.

On 6 November 2012, Güiza signed for Malaysia Super League side Johor Darul Ta'zim F.C. on a season-long loan. His move, along with the acquisition of former S.S. Lazio winger Simone Del Nero and seven Malaysian internationals, was part of the club's major restructuring plans upon the appointment of Tunku Ismail Idris, the Crown Prince of Johor, as president; based on past achievements and honours the player, at the time of his signing, was arguably the most prolific footballer to have competed in the league.

Güiza made his first competitive appearance and league debut for his new team on 8 January 2013, in an opening day away game against Pahang FA: despite a 2–3 defeat, he provided the assists for both of his side's goals. He scored his first competitive goal on 15 January in an away game against treble-winners Kelantan FA, with an expertly curled free kick from 25 yards out as the game ended 1–1. Three days later, he netted from open play in a home fixture against 2012 Malaysia Cup runners-up ATM FA, with a volleyed lob from the edge of the penalty area in an eventual 2–2 draw.

Güiza played his last match for Johor Darul Takzim on 6 April 2013 in a 2–1 loss against Selangor FA in the FA Cup, after his loan was ended prematurely. Both he and Del Nero left the club.

In July 2013, Güiza joined Cerro Porteño on loan; his signing was initially criticised by the Paraguayan press. He made his debut on 14 September of that year as a 69th-minute substitute against Sportivo Carapeguá, scoring four minutes later in a 4–0 home win as the team went on to win their 30th Paraguayan Primera División title.

Güiza also featured in the following year's Copa Libertadores, netting three times to help to progress from the group stage and leading to interest from other clubs, to which he responded: "My heart is here, from day one they have shown me affection, my heart is what drives me, so I'm staying here". However, new manager Leonardo Astrada did not have the player in his plans, which led to his release in March 2015 despite having a contract running until June; he also cited the poor health of his father as one of the main reasons for his departure.

During his spell at the Estadio General Pablo Rojas, Güiza scored 20 goals from 59 competitive appearances. Years after leaving, he was offered a deal at Cerro's rivals Olimpia Asunción, but rejected the offer.

Cádiz
In August 2015, Güiza returned to his native Andalusia, signing for Cádiz. His arrival drew the ire of fans, due to disparaging remarks he had made about the club a decade ago while playing for local rivals Xerez.

On 26 June 2016, Güiza scored the only goal at Hércules CF in the second leg of the play-off finals (2–0 on aggregate), helping the team return to the second division after six years. On 4 July of the following year, after appearing sparingly during the season, he left.

Atlético Sanluqueño
On 10 July 2017, the 37-year-old Güiza signed a two-year contract for Atlético Sanluqueño CF, recently relegated to Tercera División. He achieved promotion to the third tier via the playoffs in his first season, having earlier become one of the few players to score in all of Spain's top four divisions.

Güiza remained in Sanlúcar de Barrameda for the ensuing seasons, agreeing to new one-year deals in June 2019 and May 2020, while his game time and goals decreased. On 3 January 2021, the 40-year-old scored his first goal of the campaign to secure a 2–1 win at Cádiz CF B, after which he asked for forgiveness from his former club.

In August 2022, Güiza left Sanluqueño. Shortly after, he joined amateurs UD Algaida.

Güiza signed with Tercera Federación club CD Rota on 19 January 2023.

International career

Güiza was a late bloomer on the international stage, having been first called up by Spain on 8 November 2007 (aged 27) for UEFA Euro 2008 qualifiers against Sweden and Northern Ireland, as the national team was already qualified for the finals in Austria and Switzerland. He made his international debut against the latter on 21 November, in a 1–0 home win in Las Palmas.

Güiza was subsequently selected to the final squad of 23 but, despite being the league's top scorer in that year, still doubted his chances of being picked: "I was really scared I'd miss out, because being the league's top scorer doesn't guarantee you a place". On 18 June 2008 he made his debut in the tournament, and scored Spain's winning goal against Greece during the dying moments of the last match group stage match. In the quarter-finals he came on as a substitute against Italy, missing the team's fourth attempt in an eventual penalty shootout win.

In the semi-final match against Russia, Güiza netted his second international goal, in a 3–0 win: after receiving a pass from Cesc Fàbregas, he quickly side-flicked it over the goalkeeper. He played 15 minutes in the final against Germany after replacing Fernando Torres (who scored the game's only goal), and came very close to assisting Marcos Senna.

On 15 October 2008, Güiza came on as a late substitute against Belgium, and soon after assisted David Villa who scored the winning goal in a close 2–1 contest for the 2010 FIFA World Cup qualifiers.

After an article circulated in January 2009 involving details about personal life and behaviour in training, Güiza's international career future was questioned. Such reports on his behaviour became debatable due to the unreliable sources and any rumours of him being dropped from the Spain team were put to rest when Vicente del Bosque called him up for his services for the 2010 World Cup qualification matches against Turkey, where he solidified his superb performance against Belgium, once again coming on in the dying minutes and assisting a last-minute winner during the match held in Istanbul.

On 1 June 2009, Güiza was selected to the 2009 FIFA Confederations Cup. On the 28th he came from the bench as the national team trailed hosts South Africa (0–1) in the third-place match, and responded with a spectacular brace in the last two minutes as Spain eventually won the game in extra-time (3–2).

Güiza also played for the Andalusia autonomous team on 27 December 2006, scoring twice in a 3–1 win over a combined Israel–Palestine side at the Estadio de La Cartuja in Seville.

Personal life

Güiza was born to a humble family. He spent his childhood in the working class neighbourhood of La Liberación, in the south side of Jerez de la Frontera.

Güiza suffered a divorce from his first wife Rocío with whom he had his first child, which gained a lot of publicity in the Spanish press. Furthermore, he admitted that "the night confuses me" and, after joining Getafe, he started to take advantage of the night life in Madrid, suffering a stomach infection as a result and subsequently being forced to go on a diet consisting of liquids alone.

During his time at Getafe, Güiza met Nuria Bermúdez. She sat for the qualifications to become an official FIFA football agent, which she passed scoring 29 points, just five below the top and went on to become Güiza's agent. She also obtained the highest score for a female football agent in Spain.

Speaking of his relationship with the model, Getafe coach Schuster said: "Ever since Dani's been with Nuria, he turns up to training and it doesn't look like he's slept under a bridge". On 1 December 2007, Bermúdez gave birth to Güiza's second son, also named Daniel, at Policlínica Miramar in Palma, Majorca.

Before Euro 2008, Güiza promised the media that if he were to win the competition, he would then propose to Bermúdez. In January 2009, the Spanish media began to publicise problems between his family and Bermúdez, with his mother apparently threatening to slit Bermúdez's throat for being a "thief". Bermúdez then left Turkey with son Daniel, amongst claims the latter was ignored by the father.

Güiza's ex-wife, Rocío Aranda, revealed that the two had met up just hours before the start of the match between England and Spain on 11 February 2009. According to Aranda, they met up in the hotel bar and went on to have sexual intercourse in one of the bedrooms. Subsequently, it was rumoured that Spain coach Del Bosque would drop him from the team. Güiza spoke against this in an interview with Marca saying: "The truth is, I hadn't seen my son in a while so I went to see him in the hotel, I have to take advantage of such opportunities to see my children. To make money, she [his ex-wife] makes up stories. I spoke with Hierro and I explained the situation. I told him that I had to see my son and I wanted to be with him. I explained everything. I tried my best to be with my son and the truth is the whole story has not come out well in the press."

Career statistics

Club

International

Scores and results list Spain's goal tally first, score column indicates score after each Güiza goal.

Honours
Fenerbahçe
Süper Lig: 2010–11
Turkish Super Cup: 2009

Cerro Porteño
Paraguayan Primera División: Clausura 2013

Spain
UEFA European Championship: 2008

Individual
Pichichi Trophy: 2007–08
Zarra Trophy: 2007–08

References

External links

1980 births
Living people
Spanish Romani people
Spanish footballers
Footballers from Jerez de la Frontera
Romani footballers
Association football forwards
La Liga players
Segunda División players
Segunda División B players
Tercera División players
Primera Federación players
Tercera Federación players
Divisiones Regionales de Fútbol players
Xerez CD footballers
RCD Mallorca B players
RCD Mallorca players
Atlético Dos Hermanas CF players
Recreativo de Huelva players
FC Barcelona Atlètic players
Ciudad de Murcia footballers
Getafe CF footballers
Cádiz CF players
Atlético Sanluqueño CF players
Süper Lig players
Fenerbahçe S.K. footballers
Malaysia Super League players
Johor Darul Ta'zim F.C. players
Paraguayan Primera División players
Cerro Porteño players
Spain international footballers
UEFA Euro 2008 players
2009 FIFA Confederations Cup players
UEFA European Championship-winning players
Spanish expatriate footballers
Expatriate footballers in Turkey
Expatriate footballers in Malaysia
Expatriate footballers in Paraguay
Spanish expatriate sportspeople in Turkey
Spanish expatriate sportspeople in Malaysia
Spanish expatriate sportspeople in Paraguay
Pichichi Trophy winners